Philippe Morillon (born 24 October 1935) is a former French general and was a Member of the European Parliament until 2009. He was elected on the Union for French Democracy ticket with the Alliance of Liberals and Democrats for Europe group. On 23 July 2004 he was elected Chair of the Committee on Fisheries.

Before turning to politics he was an army General, and commanded the United Nations Forces in Bosnia (1992-1993). In Srebrenica, Bosniak survivors fled into three eastern enclaves where the Bosnian republican army had resisted: Goražde, Žepa and Srebrenica, their populations swelled by displaced deportees, cowering, bombarded relentlessly and largely cut off from supplies of food and medicine. The population of Srebrenica swelled from 9,000 to 70,000, and by March 1993 the situation was sufficiently horrific that Philippe Morillon to lead a convoy into the battered pocket and, appalled, promised: “You are now under the protection of the UN forces. I will never abandon you.” The UN duly proclaimed Srebrenica as one of six “safe areas” to be defended by the United Nations Protection Force (our emphasis), or Unprofor. In July 1995, 8000 Bosnian men and boys were massacred in Srebrenica.

After Bosnia, Morillon commanded the Rapid Reaction Force, after which he retired with the rank of général de corps d'armée. He is a Grand Officer of the Légion d'honneur.

In September 2010, Morillon was denied access to Srebrenica Genocide memorial by Bosniak women who believed that he had allowed the Srebrenica massacre.

Education
 Graduate of École spéciale militaire de Saint-Cyr (Saint-Cyr military college) (1956) 
 the École supérieure for studies relating to electricity, Supelec (1964) 
 the Army Staff College (1974)

Career
 1984-1986: Military expert, National Assembly
 1988-1990: Member of the National Assembly Delegation for International Relations
 1993: Adviser to the government, Ministry of Defence
 1992-1993: Commander of the United Nations Forces in Bosnia
 1994-1996: Commander of the Rapid Reaction Force
 1999-2009: Member of the European Parliament
 President of the association L'envol pour les enfants européens
 Grand Officer of the Legion of Honour

See also
 2004 European Parliament election in France

References

External links
 
 

1935 births
Living people
People from Casablanca
French generals
French engineers
MEPs for West France 2004–2009
Grand Officiers of the Légion d'honneur
Union for French Democracy MEPs
Lycée Hoche alumni